Veka ( or bułka francuska) is a pastry produced in Czech Republic, Slovakia and Poland. Its character is similar to French baguette although the veka is wider, bigger, and fluffier and has smoother surface. It is made of wheat flour. Its weight is about 350 grams.

Polish regional names
Kraków – weka
Łódź – angielka
Upper Silesia – "lynga" or "weka"
Podkarpacie Province – bina
Poznań, Jelenia Góra – kawiorka
Kujawy –  "baton" or  "bułka wyborowa"
Central Poland – gryzka
Częstochowa –  linga
The veka is also referred to as "bułka kielecka" and "bułka wrocławska"

Uses in Czech cuisine

It is commonly used creating of open sandwiches called obložené chlebíčky. Eating of obložený chlebíček as a fast food snack is widespread habit and they are even sold in specialized shops called bufet or chlebíčkárna ("bread shop").

The veka can be used for certain types of knedlik (knödel). It is a major ingredient of žemlovka dish.

Production

References

Czech pastries
Polish cuisine
Slovak cuisine